Swing'n is the second studio album by American rapper Hi-C. It was released on September 28, 1993 via Skanless Records, then later re-released with two bonus tracks on August 31, 2004, by Hi-Life Records and Image Entertainment. The album peaked at number 63 on the Billboard Top R&B/Hip-Hop Albums chart and number 12 on the Heatseekers Albums chart.

Track listing

Personnel
Crawford Wilkerson – main artist, producer (tracks: 1, 2, 5, 7, 9, 11)
Kelton L. McDonald – featured artist (track 4)
Deon Barnett – featured artist (track 4)
Lil' Frogg – featured artist (tracks: 8, 12)
Casha – featured artist (track 6)
Big Jazz – featured artist (track 12)
Step – featured artist (track 13)
Tony Robert Alvarez – producer (tracks: 3, 4, 8, 10, 12, 13)
John Barnes III – producer (track 13)
Brian "B-Sly" Foxworthy – engineering, mixing
Big Bass Brian – mastering
Steve Yano – executive producer

Charts

References

External links

1993 albums
Hi-C (rapper) albums